Most Slovenian railway lines were built during the Austro-Hungarian Empire.

Overview
 gauge
 Ljubljana tram system; 18,5 km, 1901-1958
 
 gauge
 Poljčane - Zreče; 20,8 km, closed.
 Piran tram system; 5 km 750 V DC electrified tram, 1907-1952
 Parenzana railway; Triest - Škofije - Sečovlje border - Poreč, 33 km, 1902-1935.

 gauge
 Kobarid - Pojana border - Cividale del Friuli, 9 km, Società Veneta 1915-1932

 gauge
 Postojna Cave railway in Postojna; 2,5 km double track, opened in 1872.

 gauge
 Brestanica to the north; 6 km, closed construction railway.

See also
 List of steam locomotives in Slovenia
 Ljubljana Castle funicular, 70 m, opened in 2006.
 Slovenian Railway Museum

Rail transport in Slovenia